Hội An Base Camp was a Republic of Korea Marine Corps (ROKMC) and Army of the Republic of Vietnam (ARVN) base located in Hội An in central Vietnam.

History
The base was located just north of the old town of Hội An and 22 km southeast of Danang.

The base was constructed by the 58th Naval Construction Battalion starting on 1 March 1968 in what was the largest single Seabee construction mission of the Vietnam War. When construction was completed on 21 June 1968 the base complex comprised over 1300 structures and was capable of accommodating over 8000 men.

The 3rd Battalion, 21st Infantry was based here from June–July 1968

Current use
The base has been largely turned over to housing and a large Vietcong/PAVN cemetery.

References

Buildings and structures in Quảng Nam province
Installations of the Army of the Republic of Vietnam
Military installations of South Korea